Elizabeth "Betsy" Parrish (February 10, 1925 – December 16, 2022) was an American actress, singer and acting teacher.

Career
Parrish has long been affiliated with the Stella Adler Studio of Acting. Other teaching credits include: Circle in the Square, High School of Performing Arts, Metropolitan Opera Studio, Yale Drama School (Associate Professor Adjunct), American Academy of Dramatic Art, and the Eugene O'Neill International Theatre Institute.

Parrish was a founding member of the Harold Clurman Laboratory Theatre Company, having performed in Uncle Vanya, Hot L Baltimore, and Macbeth.

In 2004, she appeared in a one-woman New York musical revue, Moments of Being, with Betsy.

In 2019 and 2020, the nonagenarian Parrish performed her cabaret show, "Every Soul's a Cabaret", at, among other venues, the Martha's Vineyard Playhouse (Massachusetts) and the  
Pangea World Theater  (Minneapolis, Minnesota), respectively.

Acting credits

Broadway & Off-Broadway
 La Cage aux Folles, as Jacqueline (1983 thru 1987)
 Deathtrap as Helga ten Dorp; succeeded Marian Winters (1978 thru 1982)
 Keep It In the Family, as standby for roles of Betsy Jane and Daisy Brady
 Pickwick, as Mrs. Leo Hunter and as understudy for role of Rachel (1965)
 Riverwind as Louise Sumner (1962)
 Little Mary Sunshine as Mme. Ernestine von Liebedich (1959)
 Johnny Johnson as French Nurse (1956)

Feature films
 See You in the Morning (1989) as "Group Therapy Patient"
 Orphans (1987) as "Rich Woman"

Television
 Law & Order (1994) as "Judge Sally Norton"
 Kate & Allie (1989) as "Evelyn"
 The Edge of Night (soap opera) as "Zelda Moffett" (1981) and as "Buffy Revere" (1982)

References

External links

1925 births
2022 deaths
American film actresses
American musical theatre actresses
American stage actresses
American television actresses
Place of birth missing
21st-century American women